Crave is the second studio album by Canadian singer-songwriter Kiesza. It was released through her own label Zebra Spirit Tribe on August 14, 2020, and serves as the follow-up to her debut album, Sound of a Woman, released in 2014. The album was called a "1980s-inspired upbeat dance album" by CBC.ca.

Track listing

Charts

Release history

References

2020 albums
Kiesza albums
Island Records albums
Albums produced by Electric (music producers)
Albums produced by Chris Malinchak